"Lets Push It" is a song recorded by British house music group Nightcrawlers and released in January 1996 as the fourth single from their only album, Lets Push It (1995). It is produced by frontman John Reid, who also co-wrote it. In the UK, it peaked at number 23 in its first week at the UK Singles Chart, on 14 January. It was a notable hit also in other European countries, such as Belgium, Ireland, Scotland and Sweden. Outside Europe, the song reached number 107 in Australia. A music video was also produced to promote the single.

Critical reception
Pan-European magazine Music & Media wrote that the song "will undoubtedly prove to be another chart hit for the British funkateers. Its Eurodisco keyboard style is part of the rhythm section. "Let's Push It" is less funky and more dance-y, but the result is still a highly infectious groove. To be released in Nightcrawlers-loving France first and the rest of Europe afterwards." A reviewer from Music Week gave it two out of five, adding, "With their followers, another hit, probably. But this rather disappointing track ultimately lacks the richness and power of the three previous Top 20 successes." James Hamilton from the RM Dance Update felt it "at times [is] a proper song".

Track listings
 CD single, UK & Europe
 "Let's Push It" (7" Radio Edit) — 3:36
 "Let's Push It" (Evolution Club Mix) — 6:56
 "Let's Push It" (MK Club Mix) — 6:29
 "Let's Push It" (Boot & Mac Vocoder Mix) — 8:40
 "Let's Push It" (Evolution Dub Mix) — 8:02
 "Let's Push It" (MK Dub Mix) — 6:15

 CD maxi, CD1, Europe
 "Let's Push It" (7" Radio Edit) — 3:36
 "Let's Push It" (Evolution Club Mix) — 6:56
 "Let's Push It" (MK Club Mix) — 6:29
 "Let's Push It" (Boot & Mac Vocoder Mix) — 8:40
 "Let's Push It" (Evolution Dub Mix) — 8:02
 "Let's Push It" (MK Dub Mix) — 6:15

 CD maxi, CD2, Europe
 "Let's Push It" (Radio Edit) — 3:31
 "Push the Feeling On" (Argonaut's Smokin' Hot Mix) — 9:13
 "Surrender Your Love" (Argonaut's Mix) — 7:51
 "Push the Feeling On" (MK Dub Revisited Edit) — 4:00

Charts

References

 

1996 singles
Nightcrawlers (band) songs
Arista Records singles
1996 songs